Pulse is the fifth album from the Shetland-born singer-songwriter and musician Astrid Williamson. The album was produced by Leo Abrahams (a guitarist famed for his work with Brian Eno).

Reception

Pulse was judged by MusicOMH to be a "bold change in direction....pulled off extremely competently". The Scotsman newspaper suggested the "lilting conversational beauty of [the track] "Paperbacks" - up there with Joni Mitchell's best moments". Popmatters viewed it as "less a game-changer than a paradigm shift", while UNCUT magazine concluded it is "as beautiful as it is unsettling".

Track listing 
 Dance
 Pour
 Underwater
 Cherry
 Miracle
 Connected
 Pulse
 Husk
 Reservation
 Paperbacks

Personnel and recording details 

Astrid Williamson - vocals / guitar / harp / piano and handclaps
Leo Abrahams - bass / drums / electric guitar / bells / keyboards and tambourine
 Programming, mixing and production by Leo Abrahams
 Mastered by Mandy Parnell
 Photography by Rankin
 Artwork by Joby Barnard
 All songs composed by Astrid Williamson

References 

2011 albums
One Little Independent Records albums
Astrid Williamson albums